Panathinaikos AC Water Polo, founded in 1930, is the water polo department of Panathinaikos A.C., the Athens-based Greek multi-sport club. Despite its early establishment it doesn't have any particular honours so far. The best result it has achieved in the A1 Ethniki Water Polo is the second place.

History in the Greek Championship 
Panathinaikos AC Water Polo was initially established in 1930, but three years later it was forced to close because of the lack of a swimming pool. The club was re-established in 1959. Without facing any particular difficulties it won the tournaments of the lower divisions and managed to qualify for the first division 3 years later, in 1962.
In the years 1963, 1966, 1967, 1971, 1972, 1973, 1974 Panathinaikos WPC reached the third position. In 1993 PAO WPC returned for another time to second division. Until now PAO WPC have never won a national title. 

In 2011 the club took the third place, along with the participation ticket for the first time in its history in the LEN Euroleague. The club ended up in the third place once again in the season 2013-2014. The team finished second for the first time in its history in the season 2014-15.

Greek Cup 
In the Greek Water Polo Cup Panathinaikos participated in the final in the seasons 2014-15 and 2022-23.

The team had previously reached the semi-finals in the seasons: 1983-84, 1984-85, 2001-02, 2008-09, 2009-10, 2010-11 and 2011-12.

European Honours 

In its first participation in the LEN Euroleague (2011–12), Panathinaikos succeeded in advancing from the preliminary round to the  first group stage. The club succeeded in winning against Kharkiv and VK Primorac Kotor (8-11) but it was eventually eliminated from the second group stage.
Following its elimination from the Euroleague, PAO went on to compete in the LEN Trophy, where it advanced until the round of "16" after winning against Le Ben and eventually having a draw 7-7 against Galatasaray. Finally Panathinaikos did not advance to the quarter finals after being eliminated by Panionios 6-8 in OAKA, and 13-14 (10-12) in Nea Smirni.

Current roster
Season 2022–23

Notable players

References

External links
 Official website 

 
Panathinaikos A.O.
Water polo clubs in Greece
Sports clubs established in 1930
Sports clubs in Athens